Dennis Ernest Wilie (September 22, 1890 – June 20, 1966) was a Major League Baseball outfielder who played for three seasons. He played for the St. Louis Cardinals from 1911 to 1912 and the Cleveland Indians in 1915. He went to Baylor University and later played in the Pacific Coast League from 1915 to 1923.

External links

1890 births
1966 deaths
Major League Baseball outfielders
Cleveland Indians players
Baseball players from Texas
Corpus Christi Pelicans players
Beaumont Oilers players
Cleveland Bearcats players
Cleveland Spiders (minor league) players
Portland Beavers players
Sacramento Senators players
Oakland Oaks (baseball) players
People from Hill County, Texas